"Confusion" is a single released by British group New Order in August 1983 with the catalogue number FAC 93. It was the follow-up to their breakthrough hit "Blue Monday" and is unique for having both Peter Hook and Bernard Sumner playing bass guitars on it. The song is produced by influential New York DJ Arthur Baker. As a result, it was recorded in New York, a rarity for the band. Three remixes served as B-sides on the initial 12" release: "Confused Beats", "Confusion Instrumental" and "Confusion Rough Mix". The two tracks on side A ("Confusion" and "Confused Beats") are mixed together, which when played in sequence, act as a thirteen and half minute long remix by Arthur Baker. The "Rough Mix" on side B is the original song mixed by New Order.

Music video
The video for the single features live footage of the band in concert, intercut with images of nightlife in New York City, specifically at the "Fun House", and producer Arthur Baker and DJ John "Jellybean" Benitez at work.

Other versions
An edit of the Rough Mix represents the single on the 2005 compilation Singles. A re-recorded "Confusion" as well as the original "Confusion Instrumental" appear on the group's 1987 Substance release. The track reappeared on the 1995 remix collection The Rest of New Order as an acid techno remix by Pump Panel, which was used in 1998 as part of the soundtrack for the film Blade. Samples from The Pump Panel remix are featured on the tracks "Play It Louder" by Randy Katana and "Phatt Bass" by Warp Bros and Aquagen. The 2016 re-release of Singles includes the promo 7" edit of "Confusion".

Track listing

Released in 2004.

Chart positions

[A] – Whacked Records re-release

References

Notes

1983 songs
1983 singles
Factory Records singles
New Order (band) songs
Song recordings produced by Arthur Baker (musician)
Songs written by Arthur Baker (musician)
Songs written by Gillian Gilbert
Songs written by Peter Hook
Songs written by Stephen Morris (musician)
Songs written by Bernard Sumner
UK Independent Singles Chart number-one singles